This is a list of football (soccer) clubs in Barbados.

Digicel Premier Division
Barbados Defense Force SC
First Call Brittons Hill
Silk Soy Beverly Hills - Relegated
Carib Eden Stars
Claytons Kola Tonic Notre Dame
Caribsurf Paradise - Relegated
Tropical Laundries Pride of Gall Hill
Tudor Bridge
Ajax Construction Silver Sands
Arawak Cement Youth Milan
UWI Blackbirds

Division 1
Avis Pharmacy Haynesville
Benfica
BGI Insurance Lodge Road
Chickmont Foods Fairy Valley
Ellerton
Families First St. John Sonnets
Mackeson Oxley
Maxwell
Michael Lashley Clarkes Hill
Pinelands
Pizza Man Doc Sunrisae
Ricky's Driving School Haggatt Hall
Travel House Oxley
Valrico Technico
WIBISCO Hillaby

Cave Shepherd Division 2

Edwin Harding Zone
Covenant Life Martinique
Crusaders
Families First St. John Sonnets
Gatorade Villa United
Hothersal Turning United
Ivy Rovers
Parish Land
Restoration Ministries
Savivas Christian Club
Sea Freight (Barbados) Agencies Police

Carlos Griffith Zone
Arawak Cement Youth Milan II
Blackspurs
Carlton
Claytons Kola Tonic Notre Dame
Cosmos
Deacons
Exactly Unified
Grazettes
Jackson
Lazio
Roam

Lambert Thomas Zone
Ajax Construction Silver Sands II
Arawak Cement Youth Milan II
Barbados Defence Force
Beverley Hills
Carib Eden Stars
Caribsurf Paradise
Claytons Kola Tonic Notre Dame
First Call Brittons Hill
PCW Pinelands
Tropical Laundries Pride of Gall Hill
Tudor Bridge

Arawak Cement Division 3

Concrete Road Zone
ATC Soccer Academy
Barbados Fire Service
Belfield
Exactly Unified II
Greens United
Hothersal Turning
Stag Haggatt Hall
Station Hill
Travel House Empire 'A'
Travel House Empire 'B'

White Topping Zone
Austin Husbands Phoenix
Bagatelle FC
Diamondshire Football Club
Jackson II
Orange Hill
Pizza Man Doc Sunrise II
Trents
Wavell United
WIBISCO Hillaby II

Slaked Lime Zone
Barbados Youth Service
Benfica
BGI Insurance Lodge Road
Caribsurf Paradise
Dayrell's Road
Maxwell II
Michael Lashley Clarkes Hill 	
Wanderers

See also
Sport in Barbados

Barbados
 
Football clubs
Football clubs